Jereem Richards (born 13 January 1994) is a Trinidadian track and field sprinter who specializes in the 200 metres and 400 metres events. Richards is from Point Fortin, Trinidad and Tobago, and attended the University of Alabama. He was part of the Trinidad and Tobago team that won the bronze medal in the 4×400 m relay at the 2012 IAAF World Indoor Championships, and the gold medal in the 4 x 400m relay at the 2017 IAAF World Championships.

Career
Richards' first major competition was the 2012 IAAF World Indoor Championships. There, he ran the third leg of Trinidad and Tobago's 4x400m relay squad, which won the bronze medal.

2017 became a breakout season for Richards; he opened his season with a wind-assisted 19.98, and 16 days later he ran his first legal sub-20 with 19.97 seconds, lowering his personal best by over half a second. He won the national 200, title in 20.15 seconds, allowing him to compete at the IAAF World Championships in London later that year. He also improved his 400m personal best by 7/10ths of a second with 45.27.

Richards made his outdoor world championship debut at the IAAF World Championships in London. Competing in the 200m, he ran the fastest time in the heats of 20.05, and the next day he won his semi-final in 20.14 seconds. He then went on to win the bronze medal in the final; Ramil Guliyev of Turkey won gold in 20.09 seconds, while Wayde Van Niekerk of South Africa beat Richards to the silver medal by exactly 1/1000 of a second. Van Niekerk clocked 20.106, while Richards clocked 20.107. Richards stated that his race had been undermined when he slipped coming out of his blocks. "I tried my best not to let it affect me too much," he said. "At the turn I wasn't in contention really, so to get a medal from there is a great achievement." Three days later, he ran the second leg for Trinidad and Tobago in the Men's 4x400m relay, making considerable ground of the USA's Gil Roberts before handing the baton to Machel Cedenio. The team ultimately went on to win gold.

In September later that year, Richards announced that he was turning professional, and foregoing his final year of collegiate eligibility; he signed an endorsement deal with Adidas. Despite turning pro, he remained enrolled at Alabama to continue work towards his degree.

In March 2018, he competed in the 2018 IAAF World Indoor Championships in Birmingham, as the second leg of Trinidad and Tobago's 4x400m relay squad. Despite being the defending champions, they ultimately came fourth. Richards tried to overcome Poland on the second leg but remained third on the second lap. Lalonde Gordon gave up on the line, giving Belgium the bronze.

Richards qualified for the 2020 Summer Olympics in Tokyo in the men’s 200-metre event, and clocked a season’s best time of 20.10 seconds while finishing in third place in his semifinal heat to advance to the final. In the final he finished eighth in 20.39 seconds.

In 2022, at the IAAF World Indoor Championships held in Belgrade, Serbia, Richards won gold in the men's 400m event breaking Trinidad and Tobago's national indoor record as well as the championship record of 45.11s which was formerly held by Nery Brenes of Costa Rica in 2012. Jereem Richards' time in the final of 45.00s broke Deon Lendore's former national record of 45.05s. Lendore also bagged bronze medals at the two previous editions of the championships. Richards ran in tribute to Lendore's memory who tragically died on 10 January 2022 in a fatal car accident in Texas where he lived.

At the 2022 Commonwealth Games in Birmingham, England, Jereem Richards won the 200m title for the second time beating England's Zharnel Hughes who was previously disqualified in the previous edition of the games for impeding Richards. Richards' time of 19.80s broke the Commonwealth Games record of 19.97s which was previously held by Frankie Fredericks of Namibia as it also made Richards the second fastest Trinbagonian of all time behind Ato Boldon.
Later, at the Games' final event (Men's 4x400m relay), Richards anchored the Trinidad and Tobago quartet to gold in a time of 3:01:59s earning his second gold medal of the games and the most of any Trinbagonian athlete competing at the games. The performance of the athletes at the 2022 Commonwealth Games were the best performance by any Trinbagonian team since the 1966 edition.

References

External links

1994 births
Living people
Trinidad and Tobago male sprinters
Athletes (track and field) at the 2014 Commonwealth Games
Athletes (track and field) at the 2018 Commonwealth Games
World Athletics Championships medalists
World Athletics Championships athletes for Trinidad and Tobago
Commonwealth Games medallists in athletics
Commonwealth Games gold medallists for Trinidad and Tobago
People from Point Fortin
Athletes (track and field) at the 2019 Pan American Games
Pan American Games silver medalists for Trinidad and Tobago
Pan American Games bronze medalists for Trinidad and Tobago
Pan American Games medalists in athletics (track and field)
Commonwealth Games gold medallists in athletics
World Athletics Championships winners
Medalists at the 2019 Pan American Games
Athletes (track and field) at the 2020 Summer Olympics
Olympic athletes of Trinidad and Tobago
World Athletics Indoor Championships winners
Medallists at the 2018 Commonwealth Games